Chiusa Sclafani is a comune (municipality) in the Metropolitan City of Palermo in the Italian region Sicily, located about  south of Palermo. 
 
Chiusa Sclafani borders the following municipalities: Bisacquino, Burgio, Caltabellotta, Corleone, Giuliana, Palazzo Adriano.

Twin cities
  Chiclana de Segura, Spain
  Montanaro, Italy

References

Municipalities of the Metropolitan City of Palermo